Boninena hiraseana is a species of air-breathing land snail, a terrestrial pulmonate gastropod mollusk in the family Enidae.

This species is endemic to Japan.

References

Enidae
Taxonomy articles created by Polbot